Semibratovo is an urban locality (an urban-type settlement) in Rostovsky District of Yaroslavl Oblast, Russia. Population:

References

Urban-type settlements in Yaroslavl Oblast
Yaroslavl Governorate